An election was held on November 6, 2018 to elect 17 of the 33 members of Wisconsin's State Senate. The election coincided with elections for other offices, including U.S. Senate, U.S. House of Representatives, Governor and State Assembly. The primary election was held on August 14, 2018.

Republicans maintained control of the Senate, winning 11 seats compared to 6 seats for the Democrats.

Results

Statewide
Statewide results of the 2018 Wisconsin State Senate election:

Close races
Seats where the margin of victory was under 10%:
  
  
  
  
 
  (gain)

District
Results of the 2018 Wisconsin State Senate election by district:

Notes

References

Wisconsin State Senate
State Senate
2018